Somok Kingsada is a Laotian politician. He is a member of the Lao People's Revolutionary Party. He is a representative of the National Assembly of Laos for Luang Prabang Province (Constituency 6).

References

Lao People's Revolutionary Party politicians
Living people
Members of the National Assembly of Laos
Year of birth missing (living people)